Galina Vladimirovna Likhachova (born July 15, 1977 in Sverdlovsk) is a Russian speed skater who won a bronze medal in the Women's team pursuit at the 2006 Winter Olympics.

References
 

1977 births
Living people
Speed skaters at the 2006 Winter Olympics
Speed skaters at the 2010 Winter Olympics
Olympic speed skaters of Russia
Olympic bronze medalists for Russia
Sportspeople from Yekaterinburg
Olympic medalists in speed skating
Russian female speed skaters
Medalists at the 2006 Winter Olympics